Fernando Verdasco was the defending champion, but chose not to compete in 2010.  Sergiy Stakhovsky won in the final against Denis Istomin, 3–6, 6–3, 6–4.

Seeds
All seeds received a bye into the second round.

Draw

Finals

Top half

Section 1

Section 2

Bottom half

Section 3

Section 4

References
Main Draw 
Qualifying

Men's Singles